The Imhoff tank, named for German engineer Karl Imhoff (1876–1965), is a chamber suitable for the reception and processing of sewage. It may be used for the clarification of sewage by simple settling and sedimentation, along with anaerobic digestion of the extracted sludge. It consists of an upper chamber in which sedimentation takes place, from which collected solids slide down inclined bottom slopes to an entrance into a lower chamber in which the sludge is collected and digested. The two chambers are otherwise unconnected, with the more liquid sewage flowing only through the upper sedimentation chamber and only a slow flow of sludge in the lower digestion chamber. The lower chamber requires separate biogas vents and pipes for the removal of digested sludge, typically after 6–9 months of digestion. The Imhoff tank is in effect a two-story septic tank and retains the septic tank's simplicity while eliminating many of its drawbacks, which largely result from the mixing of fresh sewage and septic sludge in the same chamber.

Imhoff tanks are being superseded in sewage treatment by plain sedimentation tanks using mechanical methods for continuously collecting the sludge, which is moved to separate digestion tanks. This arrangement permits both improved sedimentation results and better temperature control in the digestion process, leading to a more rapid and complete digestion of the sludge.

A test for settleable solids in water, wastewater and stormwater uses an Imhoff cone, with or without stopcock.  The volume of solids is measured after a specified time period at the bottom of a one-liter cone using graduated markings.

See also 
Anaerobic digester types
List of waste water treatment technologies

References

External links 
 Imhoff Tank implications
 Imhoff OM guide, Texas

Anaerobic digester types
Sewerage infrastructure